Sympistis heliophila is a species of moth in the family Noctuidae (the owlet moths). It is found in Europe and northern Asia (excluding China) and North America.

The MONA or Hodges number for Sympistis heliophila is 10156.

References

Further reading

External links
 

heliophila
Articles created by Qbugbot
Moths described in 1793